Kurrimine Beach is a coastal town and locality in the Cassowary Coast Region, Queensland, Australia.

Geography
The Coral Sea forms the eastern boundary. The Kurrimine Beach National Park and Maria Creek National Park are within the locality.

History 
The town was originally called Kurrimine which is believed to be an Aboriginal word meaning sunrise or dawn. It was renamed Kurrimine Beach on 1 March 1982.

Education 
There are no schools in Kurrimine Beach. The nearest government secondary school is Silkwood State School in neighbouring Silkwood to the west. The nearest government secondary schools are Tully State High School in Tully to the south-west and Innisfail State College in Innisfail Estate to the north.

References

Further reading

External links 

 
 

Towns in Queensland
Cassowary Coast Region
Localities in Queensland
Coastline of Queensland